Emmanuel Chinedum Acho (born November 10, 1990) is a Nigerian-American former linebacker who played in the National Football League (NFL) and is currently working as an analyst for Fox Sports 1. He played college football at Texas before being drafted by the Cleveland Browns in the sixth round of the 2012 NFL Draft. In 2013, he was traded to the Philadelphia Eagles, where he played until retiring from the sport in 2015. In addition to his broadcasting responsibilities, he created and hosted an anti-racism digital series Uncomfortable Conversations with a Black Man. He published a book with the same title, and released a second book, Uncomfortable Conversations with a Black Boy, of which both became New York Times bestselling books.

Early years
Acho is Nigerian American and was born in Dallas to Igbo immigrants, Dr. Sonny and Christie Acho, from Isuikwuato, Nigeria. He has three siblings. The entire family has been involved in African missionary work since the children were young, and the parents are on the board of directors of the Living Hope Christian Ministries and its Operation Hope, which provides medical services in Nigeria. Sonny Acho has also served as pastor to the Living Hope Bible Fellowship Church and as a mental health professional in North Dallas.

Acho graduated from the St. Mark's School of Texas in Dallas, Texas, where he lettered in football, basketball and track and field. As a senior, he was tabbed the state's top linebacker by Dave Campbell's Texas Football and one of the 150 top recruits in the country by ESPNU. In track, he recorded personal bests of 57-4 (shot put) and 177-3 (discus, which remains the school's record). Widely recruited, he chose to attend the University of Texas.

One of his siblings, Sam Acho, also attended St. Mark's and the University of Texas before a career in the NFL.

College career

Acho played in 48 games during his 4-year career at Texas, including 26 starts. As a senior, he was consensus first-team All-Big 12 linebacker (Coaches, AP, Houston Chronicle, San Antonio Express-News, Fort Worth Star-Telegram). He won the 2010 Arthur Ashe Award, was named to the 2011 AFCA Good Works Team, and was a three-time first-team Academic All-Big 12 selection. He was also a finalist for the 2011 Lott Trophy for college football's Defensive IMPACT Player of the Year, Lowe's Senior CLASS Award and Wuerffel Trophy. He led his team in tackles in 2011 and, over his 4-year career, recorded 278 tackles (159 solo), 41 TFL, eight sacks, seven forced fumbles, three fumble recoveries, two INTs, 13 PBU and 26 pressures.

He graduated in December 2011 with a degree in sports management and completed his master's degree in sports psychology in 2017, both from the University of Texas at Austin.

Professional career

NFL football 

Acho was drafted by the Cleveland Browns in the sixth round of the 2012 NFL Draft. He was placed on injured reserve after a leg injury and missed the entire 2012 season. On April 11, 2013, Acho was traded to the Philadelphia Eagles for running back Dion Lewis. He was released on September 2, 2013. On September 10, 2013, Acho was signed to the New York Giants practice squad.

The Philadelphia Eagles signed Acho off the Giants' practice squad on October 21, 2013, after Jake Knott was injured, and he saw limited playing time in 6 games, getting his first NFL tackles. He was made gameday inactive once Mychal Kendricks and Jake Knott were back. Acho was waived by the Eagles on December 17, 2013, before the season ended, but signed to the practice squad the next day. He was re-signed to the team on January 6, 2014, during the off season; released on August 30, 2014 and then added to the Eagles practice squad the next day. Acho was promoted to the active roster on September 9, 2014, after Najee Goode was injured. Following DeMeco Ryans' season-ending injury in Week 9, he was thrust into a prominent role, along with Casey Matthews. He played in 14 games and recorded 31 tackles. In 2015, after being waived as part of the cuts to 53 due to a thumb injury, Acho was signed back to the Philadelphia Eagles on November 9 after Jordan Hicks was placed on Injured Reserve with a shoulder injury, but he saw no playing time and was released on November 24, 2015, making him a free agent. This transaction marked the end of Acho's NFL career.

Media
Acho took a temporary job in 2016 as an analyst for the Longhorn Network and then transitioned to a full-time analyst that fall. In 2018, he was promoted to ESPN2's college football programming. Acho was one of four hosts of "Cover Four" which airs on the official website of the Dallas Cowboys, and was one of four anchors at the Texas Gameday Desk on the Longhorn Network. On June 10, 2020, it was announced that he would be leaving ESPN to join Fox Sports and co-host the afternoon studio show Speak for Yourself, replacing Jason Whitlock.

On June 3, 2020, following the murder of George Floyd, Acho began a digital series, entitled Uncomfortable Conversations with a Black Man, "in order to educate and inform on racism, system racism, social injustice, rioting & the hurt Black people are feeling today". He wrote a book of the same name, which was released on November 10, 2020, by Macmillan Publishers. According to Acho, 18,000 copies were sold on its first day. An adapted version for young readers, entitled Uncomfortable Conversations with a Black Boy, was published on May 4, 2021, by the same publisher.() and became a #1 New York Times bestseller in its first week of publication

On February 27, 2021, Acho announced that he would host the 25th season of The Bachelor "After the Final Rose" Special, replacing Chris Harrison. He has been invited twice to compete on The Bachelorette, and is friends with Rachel Lindsay, who encouraged him to do "Uncomfortable Conversations".

On June 8, 2021, Acho received a Sports Emmy for Outstanding Sports Personality/Emerging On-Air Talent following his first season co-hosting Speak for Yourself.

On September 19, 2021, Acho received a PrimeTime Emmy for Outstanding Short form Nonfiction or Reality Series for his digital series, Uncomfortable Conversations with a Black Man.

Acho's third book was published in March 2022: Illogical : Saying Yes to a Life Without Limits (Macmillan Publishers). In this book he encourages readers "to become change-makers".

On August 31, 2022, FS1 announced their new fall lineup, promoting Acho as the lead anchor of the rebranded SPEAK, accompanied by two-time Super Bowl champion and six-time Pro Bowler LeSean McCoy and longtime FS1 studio show contributor and host Joy Taylor.

Personal life 
Acho's older brother, Sam, played nine years in the NFL and is currently an ESPN sports analyst.

On January 9, 2015, Eagles fan Hannah Delmonte contacted Acho via Instagram. Delmonte asked Acho to escort her to her junior prom if she received 2,000 retweets on Twitter. Acho felt 2,000 retweets was too low, so he increased it to 10,000 retweets and gave Delmonte one week to meet the goal. Less than three hours later, Delmonte posted a picture showing that she'd received over 10,000 retweets, and Acho accepted the invitation. On February 20, 2015, Acho took time off from his graduate studies at the University of Texas and flew to Purcellville, VA, to personally accept Delmonte's prom invitation, nicknamed 'Promposal' by the media. On May 9, 2015, Acho escorted Delmonte to her junior prom in Purcellville, VA.

Acho is a Christian. Acho has continued his family's medical missionary work, writing in a 2018 tweet: "Everybody wants to be the #BlackPanther until it is time to actually save lives in Africa. My family's annual mission trip to #Nigeria COMPLETE! We treated over 1,800 patients, performed 162 surgeries & tried to love like Jesus does."

Acho delivered the Commencement speech at the University of Texas at Austin in May 2022, a moment he said was the 'biggest honor of my life'.

He is also a baritone and piano player.

See also
Notable alumni of St. Mark's School of Texas

References

External links
Philadelphia Eagles bio
Texas Longhorns bio
 

1990 births
American Christians
American football defensive ends
American football linebackers
American people of Igbo descent
American sportspeople of Nigerian descent
Cleveland Browns players
ESPN people
Igbo sportspeople
Living people
New York Giants players
Philadelphia Eagles players
Players of American football from Dallas
St. Mark's School (Texas) alumni
Texas Longhorns football players